William Moss or Bill Moss may refer to:
William Moss (Australian politician) (1891–1971)
W. Stanley Moss or Ivan William Stanley Moss (1921–1965), British WWII army officer, writer and broadcaster
Bill Moss (musician) (1930–2007), American gospel music singer
Bill Moss (racing driver) (1933–2010), British former racing driver
Bill Moss Jr. (born 1971), American gospel singer-songwriter, composer, arranger and producer
Bill Moss (tennis) (fl. 1940s), British tennis player and four-time winner of the British Pro Championships